Stamford East railway station was the Stamford and Essendine Railway station in Water Street, Stamford, Lincolnshire. The line was worked by the Great Northern Railway but retained its independence until 1886, when the GNR took the line on perpetual lease.

Opening
The station was opened in 1856 as the terminus of the line to Essendine on the Great Northern Railway main line. The line was mainly intended for passengers travelling north, however through bookings were possible to Peterborough in direct competition with the Midland Railway.

In 1867, the S&ER opened a line to Wansford on the London and North Western Railway Nene Valley line from Northampton to Peterborough. The Wansford line ran east immediately adjacent to, on the north side, of the Midland line for over 2 miles, before gaining height and crossing over the Midland and curving south just before Uffington & Barnack station. This section is now part of the Torpel Way public footpath.

The Essendine line was built single track with provision for double tracking, and at one time it was double tracked, but the signalling arrangements did not meet with Board of Trade approval. Rather than make the necessary alterations, it was single tracked again except for the section between Stamford East and the Martin's Cultivators works. This section was left as two tracks but was operated as two single track lines, with one a running line and the other an industrial siding. This siding, known as Priory Siding, also served Priory Lime Works and the Blackstone & Company Limited works.

Services
In 1863, the service consisted of eleven trains each way between Stamford and Essendine on weekdays, and two on Sundays.
In 1910 the service was fifteen each way on the Essendine branch, seven to Wansford, and eight return, with one extra on Fridays, but no Sunday services, and by 1922, this was reduced to ten each way on weekdays on the Essendine line and four on the  Wansford line.

Through freight
The Midland Railway was granted running powers over the Stamford and Essendine in 1866 and used it to send goods traffic to the Eastern & Midland Railway at Bourne and thence to East Anglia, but the junction arrangements at Essendine, where a reversal and flat crossing of the GNR main line were required, meant that as traffic increased, the route via Peterborough and the Great Eastern became preferred. To regain traffic, the Eastern & Midland obtained powers in 1888 for a direct line from Bourne to the Midland Railway station at Saxby, near Melton Mowbray, and when this opened, most of the remaining east–west goods traffic was rerouted via the new line.

Closure
The Wansford service never regained the traffic lost during the general strike, and closed to passengers in 1929.  Ordnance Survey maps of 1946 show the line as in situ, but disused, from Stamford to half a mile north of Wansford Road station. The Essendine service survived until 1959, but East station closed to passengers two years earlier in 1957 when services were diverted to the Midland Railway station.

East station continued in use for a few years as a goods station, and Priory Siding survived into the 1970s although truncated to the Blackstone & Company Limited works. The site was developed for housing. The former goods shed of circa 1856, east-south-east of the station, is a Grade II listed building.

Stationmasters
From 1936, Stamford East was managed by the station master at Stamford Midland Station.

J.W. Howe ca. 1856
Henry Edwards ca. 1863 - 1873
Robert Linfoot 1873 - 1878 (formerly station master at Little Bytham)
S. Chesterton 1878 - ca. 1880
Matthew Brown until 1882
W. Easterfield 1882 - 1885 (formerly station master at Newark North Gate)
Thomas Blunt 1885 - 1895 (formerly station master at Spalding)
John Cooke 1895 - 1904 (formerly station master at Louth)
John George 1905 - 1922
H. Spencer until 1925
Herbert Edward Cullen 1925 - 1936 (formerly station master at Ramsey)
W.T. Dickens 1936 - 1940 (also station master at Stamford)
Joseph Henry Marshall until 1946
John E. Pridmore 1946 - 1957

Summary of former train services

Sample train timetable for July 1922 

The table below shows the train departures from Stamford East on weekdays in July 1922.

Gallery

References

External links
 Brief history of Stamford railways

Disused railway stations in Lincolnshire
Former Great Northern Railway stations
Railway stations in Great Britain opened in 1856
Railway stations in Great Britain closed in 1957
Buildings and structures in Stamford, Lincolnshire